The cuisines of Oceania include those found on Australia, New Zealand, and New Guinea, and also cuisines from many other islands or island groups throughout Oceania.

Since the region of Oceania consists of islands, seafood is a prominent part of the diet, with vegetables such as potatoes, sweet potato, taro and yams being the main starch. Coconut, and its derivative products such as coconut milk, coconut oil and coconut sugar, is an important ingredient in the tropics of Oceania.

One of the most distinctive styles of cooking throughout Oceania is the earth oven, a method which involves laying food on hot rocks and burying it in earth. The technique originated in Papua New Guinea and was subsequently spread by Austronesian seafarers.

Australia
Other than by climate and produce availability, Australian cuisine has been influenced by the tastes of settlers to Australia. The British colonial period established a strong base of interest in Anglo-Celtic style recipes and methods. Later influences developed out of multicultural immigration and included Chinese, Japanese, Malaysian, Thai, and Vietnamese cuisines. Mediterranean cuisine influences from Greek cuisine, Italian cuisine, and Lebanese cuisine influences are strong, also influences from French cuisine, Indian cuisine, Spanish cuisine, and Turkish cuisine, German cuisine, and African cuisine. Regional Australian cuisines commonly use locally grown vegetables based on seasonal availability, and Australia also has large fruit growing regions. The Granny Smith variety of apples originated in Sydney, Australia in 1868. In the Southern states of Victoria and South Australia, in particular the Barossa Valley, wines and food reflects the region's traditions and heritage. Australia's climate makes barbecues commonplace. Barbecue stalls selling sausages and fried onion on white bread with tomato or barbecue sauce are common.

  Australian cuisine
  New South Wales cuisine
  Northern Territory cuisine
  Queensland cuisine
  South Australian cuisine
  Tasmanian cuisine
  Victorian cuisine
  Western Australian cuisine
  Christmas Island cuisine 
  Cocossian cuisine
  Norfolk Island cuisine

Melanesia

  Fijian cuisine
  New Caledonian cuisine 
  Papua New Guinean cuisine
  Solomon Islands cuisine
  Vanuatuan cuisine

Micronesia

  Gilbertese cuisine
  Guamanian cuisine
  Marshallese cuisine
  Micronesian cuisine
  Nauruan cuisine
  Northern Marianan cuisine
  Palauan cuisine

Polynesia
Polynesian cuisine encompasses the culinary practices of Polynesia, an area notably defined as the Polynesian Triangle and occasionally, the Polynesian outliers that have been settled by Polynesian seafarers. The vast area of Polynesia has had a great influence on the cuisine itself, differing as a result of climate, geography and neighbouring island groups, such as the practice of harvesting and boiling down coconut sap in the atolls from Micronesian peoples or the harvesting and processing of sago in the outliers from Melanesians. Polynesian cuisine has been influenced by the traditional ingredients and preparations of the Polynesians, as well as European, Asian and American culinary practices. The Polynesian cuisine had influenced the Malagasy cuisine.

  American Samoan cuisine
  Cook Islands cuisine
  French Polynesian cuisine
  Hawaiian cuisine
  Native Hawaiian cuisine
  New Zealand cuisine
  Māori cuisine
  Niuean cuisine
  Pascuense cuisine
  Pitcairn Islands cuisine
  Samoan cuisine
  Tokelauan cuisine
  Tongan cuisine
  Tuvaluan cuisine
  Wallis and Futuna cuisine

See also 
 List of cuisines
 Culture of Oceania

References 

 
Cuisine by continent
Food- and drink-related lists
Cuisine